Eta Leonis (η Leo, η Leonis) is a fourth-magnitude star in the constellation Leo, about  away.

Properties 
Eta Leonis is a white supergiant with the stellar classification A0Ib.  Since 1943, the spectrum of this star has served as one of the stable anchor points by which other stars are classified.  Though its apparent magnitude is 3.5, making it a relatively dim star to the naked eye, it is nearly 20,000 times more luminous than the Sun, with an absolute magnitude of -5.60. The Hipparcos astrometric data has estimated the distance of Eta Leonis to be roughly 390 parsecs from Earth, or 1,270 light years away.

Eta Leonis is apparently a multiple star system, but the number of components and their separation is uncertain.

References

External links 
Jim Kaler's Stars: Eta Leonis

Leo (constellation)
Leonis, Eta
A-type supergiants
BD+17 2171
Leonis, 30
3975
87737
049583